Fenwick is a community in the Canadian province of Ontario, in the town of Pelham. It is located in the Niagara Region. Welland is the closest city center. Fenwick has a population of 1,500.

History
The community was named in 1853. The name probably comes from Fenwick, East Ayrshire in Scotland, which was the birthplace of Dr. John Fraser, who was reeve of Pelham Township at the time.

The post office dates from 1862.

See also
List of communities in Ontario

References

External links
Fenwick at Geographical Names of Canada

Neighbourhoods in Pelham, Ontario